Opisthoteuthis medusoides is a cirrate octopus living off the coast of Tanzania near Dar es Salaam. However, its actual range may be more extensive. 

The species is known from only two juvenile octopuses. Both had little pigment. Because of the octopus' medusoid (jellyfish-like) body shape, the species was given the name medusoides. Male opisthoteuthids generally have enlarged suckers on multiple arms; O. medusoides is different, having enlarged suckers on only one arm. "A redescription of this species is badly needed," write Richard E. Young and Michael Vecchione, both scientists who research cephalopods.

References

External links
Definition of medusoid at Wiktionary

Octopuses
Molluscs described in 1915
Marine molluscs of Africa
Molluscs of the Indian Ocean